Michael Schaefer is a German film producer best known for the 2015 film The Martian.

Career 
In July 2012, after leaving Summit Entertainment, Schaefer was hired as the president of the Ridley Scott's company, Scott Free Productions.

In 2015, Schaefer produced the science fiction film The Martian starring Matt Damon, which Scott directed. He received an Academy Award nomination for the film for Best Picture at the 88th Academy Awards along with Simon Kinberg, Scott, and Mark Huffam. 

In October 2016, it was announced that Schaefer would be leaving Scott Free to become president at Arnon Milchan's New Regency.

Filmography

References

External links 
 

German film producers
Year of birth missing (living people)
Place of birth missing (living people)
Living people
Film people from Dortmund
Golden Globe Award-winning producers